Swan's Way is a long distance bridle route and footpath in Northamptonshire, Buckinghamshire and Oxfordshire, England.  It runs  from Salcey Forest, Northamptonshire to Goring-On-Thames, Oxfordshire. Although designed for horseriders by riders, it is a multi-use trail also available to walkers and cyclists.

For walkers the path links with the Ridgeway National Trail, the western end of the Icknield Way Path, the Ouse Valley Way and the Three Shires Way.

References

External links 
Buckinghamshire County Council leaflet

Long-distance footpaths in England
Bridleroutes in the United Kingdom
Footpaths in Northamptonshire
Footpaths in Buckinghamshire
Footpaths in Oxfordshire